USCGC Dependable (WMEC–626) is a United States Coast Guard medium endurance cutter. Her keel was laid down by American Ship Building Company, Lorain, Ohio July 17, 1967 and she was launched March 16, 1968. Dependable was commissioned November 22, 1968 and her current homeport is Virginia Beach, Virginia. On February 24, 1995 she was decommissioned for Major Maintenance Availability (MMA), an 18-month, 21.7 million dollar project to overhaul and upgrade selected systems and equipment. The Coast Guard anticipates another fifteen years of service due to these renovations. She was re-commissioned United States Coast Guard Yard in Baltimore, Maryland on August 15, 1997.

History

For 23 years she was homeported in Panama City, Florida.  In January 1992, the ship and her crew relocated to Galveston, Texas.   Portsmouth, Virginia was her home before being relocated to her new home in Cape May, New Jersey, on August 4, 2000. On May 30, 2015 her homeport was shifted to Joint Expeditionary Base Little Creek-Fort Story in Virginia Beach, Virginia. Her mission remains the same in Virginia Beach as in the past.  Examples of her missions include enforcing fishery regulations in the Atlantic, interdicting drug traffickers in the Caribbean, and rescuing Cuban and Haitian migrants in the Florida Straits.
 
In her 3rd year conducting law enforcement patrols, the crew intercepted and interdicted 15% of the marijuana seized by the entire Coast Guard. She then went on to receive national recognition on August 23, 1981 when seizing the fishing vessel “Sea King” for trafficking 9 tons of marijuana. In February 2000, she participated in a joint effort with a Coast Guard Law Enforcement Detachment. After the detachment seized fishing vessel “Rebelde”, she towed the vessel from Cristobal, Panama and transported 6 tons of cocaine and 7 smugglers to Tampa, Florida, for prosecution. The journey lasted several days and covered .
 
The Dependable has received several awards including three Coast Guard Unit Commendations.  She also has received two Coast Guard Meritorious Unit Commendations and the Humanitarian Service Medal for her lifesaving operations during the 1980 Cuban exodus.

External links 
Dependable home page

Historic American Engineering Record in Virginia
Reliance-class cutters
Ships built in Lorain, Ohio
Ships of the United States Coast Guard
1968 ships